Richard Juma (born 19 July 1945) is a Kenyan long-distance runner. He competed in the marathon at the 1972 Summer Olympics. Juma won bronze medals in the 10,000 metres in the 1973 All-Africa Games and in the 1974 British Commonwealth Games.

References

1945 births
Living people
Athletes (track and field) at the 1972 Summer Olympics
Kenyan male long-distance runners
Kenyan male marathon runners
Olympic athletes of Kenya
Athletes (track and field) at the 1974 British Commonwealth Games
Athletes (track and field) at the 1978 Commonwealth Games
Commonwealth Games bronze medallists for Kenya
Commonwealth Games medallists in athletics
African Games bronze medalists for Kenya
African Games medalists in athletics (track and field)
Place of birth missing (living people)
Athletes (track and field) at the 1973 All-Africa Games
20th-century Kenyan people
21st-century Kenyan people
Medallists at the 1974 British Commonwealth Games